Malcolm Spence may refer to:

 Malcolm Spence (Jamaican athlete) (1936–2017), Jamaican sprinter
 Malcolm Spence (South African athlete) (1937–2010), South African sprinter